2021 Spanish regional elections may refer to:

2021 Catalan regional election
2021 Madrilenian regional election